The Ni-Vanuatu Ambassador in Beijing is the official representative of the Government in Port Vila to the Government of the People's Republic of China.

List of representatives 

 China–Vanuatu relations

References 

 
Vanuatu
Ambassadors